Lal Kajol is a 1982 Bangladeshi film starring Shabana and Farooque opposite him. Child actor Bindi Hossain garnered Bangladesh National Film Awards for Best Child Artist and producer Azizur Rahman garnered Best Film Award at Bachsas Awards.

Awards 
Bangladesh National Film Awards
Best Child Artist - Bindi Hossain

Bachsas Awards
Best Film - Azizur Rahman

References

1982 films
Bengali-language Bangladeshi films
Films scored by Satya Saha
Films directed by Motin Rahman
1980s Bengali-language films
Best Film Bachsas Award winners